Vexillum brunneolinea is a species of small sea snail, marine gastropod mollusk in the family Costellariidae, the ribbed miters.

Description
The length of the shell attains 25.5 mm, its diameter 7.5 mm.

Distribution
This marine species occurs off Palau, Western Oacific.

References

External links
 Rosenberg, G.; Salisbury, R. A. (1991). Two new species of Vexillum from the Western Pacific (Gastropoda: Costellariidae). The Nautilus. 105: 147-151.

brunneolinea
Gastropods described in 1991